Antonino Grano (1660–1718) was an Italian painter and engraver, principally active in Sicily. Putatively, he was from Palermo.

Sources
Comune of Palermo, biographical archival entries.

External links

1660 births
1718 deaths
Baroque painters
17th-century Italian painters
Italian male painters
18th-century Italian painters
Artists from Palermo
18th-century Italian male artists